The Samsung Galaxy Xcover FieldPro is an Android-based smartphone announced by Samsung. This phone has 5.1 inches QHD display and 12MP main camera.

References 

Android (operating system) devices
Samsung mobile phones
Samsung Galaxy
Samsung smartphones
Mobile phones introduced in 2019
Mobile phones with user-replaceable battery